Olympiacos F.C. Youth Academy is the football academy system of Greek professional football club Olympiacos consisting of six official youth teams (Under-10, Under-13, Under-14, Under-15, Under-17 and Under-19), based on the young athletes' age.  Other age-based youth teams (e.g. Under-8) are also part of the academy, however they do not appear as official youth teams.  Olympiacos' U-15, U-17 and U-20 teams all play in Greek Superleague's youth competitions (Super League U-15, U-17 and U-19 respectively), while the U19 team is a regular participant in the UEFA Youth League.  The latter also featured in the 2012-13 Next Gen Series, reaching the quarter-finals of the competition.

Academy Personnel 

As of 27 September 2021

Olympiacos U-19 Squad 

As of 17 September 2021

Olympiacos U-17 Squad 

As of 17 September 2021

Olympiacos U-15 Squad 

As of 17 September 2021

Honours 

Titles won by the Olympiacos academy's teams.

Olympiacos U-20

 Greek Superleague U-20:  2009-10, 2012-13, 2014-15, 2015-16, 2016-17
 U-20 Torino Tournament:  2009
 Dubai Emirates Cup:  2010
 Memoria XXVIII Torneo Juvenil:  2012

Olympiacos U-17

 Greek Superleague U-17:  2009–10, 2010–11, 2014–15, 2016-17, 2017-18, 2018-19
 U-17 Shakhtar Donetsk Tournament:  2008
 U-17 Anorthosi Cyprus Tournament:  2010
 U-17 Tannenhof Cup:  2013
 U-17 Chicago Indoor Soccer League Champions:  2016

Olympiacos U-15

 Greek Superleague U-15:  2013-14, 2015-16, 2019-20
 U-15 Annual Swallows Cup:  2015
 U-15 Chicago Holiday Cup Tournament:  2015

References

Olympiacos F.C.
UEFA Youth League teams
Football academies in Greece
NextGen series